Mujhe Insaaf Chahiye is a 1983 Indian Hindi-language legal drama film directed by T. Rama Rao and produced by D. V. S. Raju. The film stars Mithun Chakraborty, Rati Agnihotri, Rekha, Ranjeeta, Danny Denzongpa in pivotal roles. It is a remake of the Telugu film Nyayam Kavali. Rekha received a nomination for Filmfare Award for Best Supporting Actress, the only nomination for the film.

Plot 
Malti (Rati Agnihotri), a young girl from a middle-class family meets Suresh Rai (Mithun Chakraborty), who is the son of a well-known lawyer Dayashankar Rai (Danny Denzongpa). After dating each other for some time, she finds that she is pregnant. When Suresh refuses to marry Malti and she decides against aborting the baby, her parents throw her out and disown her. Left alone, she decides to take Suresh to court. She is supported in this fight by Shakuntala (Rekha), a lawyer who works for woman's rights, who also has an illegitimate daughter from Dayashankar Rai. The case gets much publicity and public support as well as the judge rules in Malti's favour. At this point however, Malti refuses to marry Suresh and decides to raise the child on her own. In the meantime, Shakuntala dies of a heart attack and Malti promises her to take care of her daughter, and carry on Shakuntala's work.

Years later, Suresh and his wife Jayshree (Ranjeeta), now married for some years and still childless, run into Malti again. It turns out that she has been raising her son all by herself and he has turned out to be a very talented and well-adjusted young and smart boy.

Cast 
Rekha as Shakuntala
Mithun Chakraborty as Suresh Rai
Rati Agnihotri as Malti Agarwal
Ranjeeta as Jayshree Rai
Danny Denzongpa as Dayashankar Rai
Seema Deo as Shanti Rai
Asrani as Abdul Lateef
Shreeram Lagoo as Viswanath Agarwal
Shubha Khote as Mrs. Agarwal
Manoj Kumar as Director Guest Appearance for taking screen test for upcoming movie CLERK

Soundtrack 
Lyrics: Anand Bakshi.

References

External links 

1980s Hindi-language films
1980s legal drama films
1983 films
Films directed by T. Rama Rao
Films scored by Laxmikant–Pyarelal
Hindi remakes of Telugu films
Indian courtroom films
Indian legal drama films
Indian pregnancy films